517 km is a rural locality (a passing loop) in Kalarskoye Rural Settlement of Tashtagolsky District, Russia. The population was 3 as of 2010.

Streets 
There is no streets with titles.

Geography 
517 km is located 55 km northwest of Tashtagol (the district's administrative centre) by road. Petukhov Log is the nearest rural locality.

References 

Rural localities in Kemerovo Oblast